This is a list of transfers in Lithuanian football for the 2022-23 winter transfer window. Only confirmed moves featuring an A Lyga side are listed.

The winter transfer window opened on January 7, 2023, and will close on March 18, 2023. Deals may be signed at any given moment in the season, but the actual transfer may only take place during the transfer window. Unattached players may sign at any moment.

Transfers In

Transfers Out

References

Lithuanian
Transfers
Transfers
Winter 2022-23